The Ngarigo People (also spelt Garego, Ngarego, Ngarago, Ngaragu, Ngarigu, Ngarrugu or Ngarroogoo) are Aboriginal Australian people of southeast New South Wales, whose traditional lands also extend around the present border with Victoria.

Language
 
Ngarigu has been classified by linguist Robert Dixon as one of two Aboriginal Australian languages of the Southern New South Wales Group, the other being Ngunawal/Gundungurra. It was spoken in the area of Tumut by the Walgalu, in the Canberra-Queanbeyan-Upper Murrumbidgee region by people variously called the Nyamudy, the Namwich or the Yammoitmithang, and also as far south as Victoria's Omeo district. The heartland of Ngarigo speakers, in a more restricted sense, was Monaro.

John Lhotsky, Charles du Vé, John Bulmer, George Augustus Robinson, Alfred W. Howitt and R. H. Mathews compiled early word-lists of the language. In 1963, Luise Hercus managed to recover many terms conserved by descendants living in Orbost.

Country
The northern limits lay around Queanbeyan. It took in the Bombala River area, and ran south to the vicinity of Delegate and eastwards to Nimmitabel. Their western reaches extended to the Great Dividing Range of the Australian Alps.

Socio-economic organisation
The Ngarigo clan and marriage structure consisted of a dual class system with matrilineal descent.

The Ngarigo would contact, via notched message sticks borne by messengers, other tribes such as the Walgalu and Ngunawal in order to arrange for all to meet up in the Bogong Mountains for the annual feasting off the Bogong moth colonies. Corroborees, together with initiation ceremonies at a bora ring were also held, and while in the hills, the Ngarigo and other tribes culled plants like mountain celery and alpine baeckea (Baeckea gunniana) for medicinal ends, preparing the former as a paste for problems in the urinary tract, the latter as a sedative and cough medicine.

Post-contact history
With their hunting areas being stolen by European colonisers running sheep, many Ngarigo took on occasional labour on pastoral runs, but the overall population of the Canberra area suffered a drastic reduction as diseases introduced by the Europeans, such as smallpox, syphilis, influenza, measles and tuberculosis began to take their toll, so that the demise of the tribes was virtually completed within three generations.

Dispute over the traditional ownership of the Canberra area
Several tribes have been historically associated with the area around Canberra, with conflicting claims arising from the assessment of native title rights among those who descend from the Aboriginal peoples of the region. Descendants of the Ngarigo, Ngunawal and Walgalu have vied to assert primacy.

In 2013, an ACT Government anthropological report was released, which concluded that the struggle between various Aboriginal groups for the mantle of Canberra's "First People" was likely to remain uncertain. The report concluded that evidence gathered from the mid-19th century onward was too scant to support any family's claims.

Alternative names

 Bemeringal ("mountain men", of the coastal tribes)
 Bombala tribe
 Bradjerak/Brajeraq. (bara, "man,"+ djerak, "savage/angry")
 Cooma tribe
 Currak-da-bidgee
 Guramal, Nguramal, Gurmal
 Menero tribe
 Murring. ("men")
 Ngaryo. (common typo)

Source:

Notable people
 Ashleigh Barty (born 1996), World No. 1 tennis player and National Indigenous Tennis Ambassador for Tennis Australia, won the 2019 French Open, the 2021 Wimbledon Championships and the 2022 Australian Open.  She wrote on Instagram in Feb 2022, "I’ve never been so proud to be a Ngarigo woman."
 Brian AJ Newman LLB, Chief Executive Officer National Aboriginal and Torres Strait Islander Corporation - Advocacy Services www.natsic.org, President Australian Prison Officers Association, Chief Executive Officer 1800ADVOCATES Pty Ltd (www.1800ADVOCATES.au), Chairman of Advocacy International and Founder of Workers First (www.workersfirst.com.au)
 Tammy Wilesmith, (born in 1974) and has 10 children (Michael (28), ......... (?), ........(?), Bailey (?), .........(?), Xavier (12), Christian (11), Piper (8), Malia (7), Stiles (5)) A medical professional and world-renowned author and best seller, Tammy has written a number of books that have landed her books on the No 1 charts around the world in countries such as the United States of America, the United Kingdom, European Union, and Canada. Tammy's book (Making it through) is currently in film production and has seen a number of famous Hollywood stars fall in love with her books. A number of talk show hosts such as Ellen Degeneres and Oprah Winfrey have conducted interviews with Mrs. Wilesmith. Tammy is a Ngarigo Elder and currently a director of her tribe as far as we are aware. 
 Michael Wilesmith, (Born in 1993) to Tammy Wilesmith and Darrel Wolter is famously known for his dedication to the development and advancement of children and youth. He is also a well-known Ngarigo Artist with more of his artwork becoming quite popular in recent years as they are highly sort after, Michael served as a Military Cadet Officer for 12 years in his teens and early adult years, firstly joining the Australian Army Cadet Corps at the Penrith Army Engineering Barracks in 2006 at the age of 12, Michael rose through the NCO's ranks and then being offered a promotion to a Senior position as the Company Commander in 2009 at the age of 16. Michael was also the face of a major push to have Aboriginal, Torres Strait Islander, and LGBT+ youth more included within the 3 corps according to his service records, even though Michael almost lost his life in 2011 after a life-threatening accident occurred at his secondary school in Western Sydney, Australia. Michael went on to attend Teachers College and obtained 2 Primary and Secondary Specialist Teaching Degrees within the fields of Special Education, it is also known that Michael has also attended Law School and obtained 2 Law and Legal Studies Degrees specializing in Criminal, Constitutional, Family, and International Law. Today Michael is known to be attending a prestigious University in Brisbane Queensland after turning down a number of International Universities such as Oxford University in England and has a range of expertise in a number of fields including Aboriginal and Torres Strait Islander Studies, Education, Law and Legal Studies and Children/Youth Development.

Notes

Citations

Sources

Aboriginal peoples of New South Wales
Aboriginal peoples of Victoria (Australia)
Indigenous Australians in the Australian Capital Territory